Goryeong County (Goryeong-gun) is a county in North Gyeongsang Province, South Korea.

Goryeong is a historical center of the ancient kingdom of Daegaya.

Administrative divisions 

Goryeong County is divided into 1 eup and 7 myeon.

Climate
Goryeong has a humid continental climate (Köppen: Dwa), but can be considered a borderline humid subtropical climate (Köppen: Cwa) using the  isotherm.

Twin towns – sister cities
Goryeong is twinned with:

  Hampyeong, South Korea 
  Seocho-gu, South Korea

See also
 Dasan-myeon
 Gaya confederacy

References

External links
Goryeong County government site 

 
Counties of North Gyeongsang Province